TouchPal is an alternative input method for mobile devices, designed and developed by Shanghai-based CooTek. It is a software application running on multiple platforms, including Android, iOS (no longer supported, only maintained), Windows Mobile, and Windows 8. It simulates a keyboard on the screen of the device, which is used to enter text by tapping on the screen or sliding a finger between letters constructing the word. It is an optional text input method to the traditional physical keyboards and default keyboards provided by the device manufacturer.

Technology 
TouchPal default keyboard layout is designed based on the "T+" technology that combines two letters and one symbol on each key, whose layout looks like a T. The overall layout of all the letters follows a common computer keyboard layout, which is the QWERTY layout.

It has a word predicting technology which predicts the most probable word or its spelling.

Ad practices 
In June 2019, it was revealed that CooTek, the developer of TouchPal was bundling malicious adware with its keyboard software, and taking steps to conceal its involvement. Google subsequently banned CooTek from the Google Play Store.

History

TouchPal v1 
TouchPal v1 was released in October 2007. It only provides the T+ layout virtual keyboard with one-layer design. There aren't any additional function keys such as Shift or Ctrl because the functions they achieve are built-in and can be easily implemented by finger tapping or sliding. It has many useful features such as self-defined sentences (My Sentences), My Commands, drag & drop buttons and comprehensive content editing functions. It only supports English input.

TouchPal v2 
TouchPal v2 comes out in late December 2007. Apart from what the v1 has to offer, its virtual keyboard is resizable by finger sliding. It also includes customizable emoticons and a few other features. It also supports several European languages input such as English, German, French, Italian, Spanish, and Dutch.

TouchPal v3 
TouchPal v3 English version is released in April 2008, together with extra European input languages. TouchPal v3 Chinese input version comes out one month later.

Compared with the previous two versions, TouchPal v3 has a lot of new features. It supports three layouts on one virtual keyboard: the T+ layout, the full QWERTY layout, and the 9-key PhonePad layout. Users can switch keyboard layouts by finger sweeping. There is also an animation effect when turning the pages or switching the layouts. TouchPal v3 significantly improves the predictive algorithm by incorporating its patent pending context-based word prediction and mistyping auto-correction algorithm. Besides, it is much more extensible than the previous two versions. With its SDK, users can self develop the supported input languages, the skins, and change the keyboard layout. It also provides changeable keypress sounds.

TouchPal v4 & v5
In November 2008, CooTek starts to release TouchPal for Android devices with its initial version (v4) mainly shipped for manufacturer. Five months later, in April 2009, CooTek launches the official public release of TouchPal v4.2.

Almost two years later, in June 2011, TouchPal Curve v4.7.6 is unveiled.

In September 2011, CooTek launches TouchPal v5.0 with milestone upgrading.

TouchPal X
In September 2013, TouchPal X v 5.4.5 comes out with various added features such as TouchPal Wave, TouchPal Curve®, Symbol and Number quick input, Emoji X, Contextual prediction and Walkie-Talkie style voice input.

References 

 Nate Adcock, "TouchPal: One of the Best Soft Keyboards", Smartphone and Pocket PC Magazine, June/July 2008 issue   
 Nate Adcock, "TouchPal-A Well-Done Soft Keyboard Alternative!", Smartphone and Pocket PC Magazine, February 10, 2008  
 Dieter Bohn, "Great New Soft Keyboard", WMExperts.com, October 4, 2007  
 Sean Cooper, "CooTek's TouchPal brings iPhone-like touchpad to Windows Mobile", Engadget Mobile, October 12, 2007
  "TouchPal's Interactive Input Technology Selected by Mercedes-Benz and Sony"

External links
 TouchPal Official Website

Mobile software
Mobile technology
Pocket PC software
Chinese brands
Virtual keyboards
Delisted applications